Sweety Nanna Jodi is a 2013 Indian Kannada romance film directed by Vijayalakshmi Singh and produced by Radhika herself under her home banner Shamika Enterprises. The film stars Auditya and Radhika in the lead roles.  It marks Radhika's comeback to films after a 5-year hiatus.

Plot

This film is about a corporate love between the main characters.

Cast
 Auditya as Siddharth
 Radhika as Priya
 Ramya Krishna as Vasundhara Devi
 Girish Karnad as Priya's father
 Jai Jagadish as Siddharth's father
 Sadhu Kokila
 Jayadev Mohan
 Rekha Das
 Tabla Nani
 Saurav Lokesh

Production 
The title of the film is based on a song from Bharjari Bete (1981). A song was shot in Kashmir.

Soundtrack
The music of the film is composed by Arjun Janya.

Release

Critical reception 
A critic from The Times of India wrote that "Aditya excels in emotional sequences but it is Ramya Krishna who steals the show with her brilliant performance". Shashiprasad S. M. of Deccan Chronicle wrote that "Apart from 'Sweety Nanna Jodi' being an attempt to relaunch the actress in the lead, the film itself has nothing new to offer".

References

External links

2013 films
2010s Kannada-language films
Indian romance films
2013 romance films
Films scored by Arjun Janya
Films directed by Vijayalakshmi Singh